Pak Song-il (born 14 May 1993) is a North Korean footballer. He represented North Korea on at least two occasions in 2013.

Career statistics

International

References

1993 births
Living people
Sportspeople from Pyongyang
North Korean footballers
North Korea international footballers
Association football forwards